HSST  may refer to:

 High Speed Surface Transport
 High stand systems tract, a system tract in sequence stratigraphy
 Springfield High School of Science and Technology
 Higher Specialist Scientific Training, see Modernising Scientific Careers
 HQMC SDA Selection Team United States Marine Corps